Charles Gibson (born 1943) is an American television personality.

Charles or Charlie Gibson may also refer to:

Charles Hopper Gibson (1842–1900), U.S. Senator from Maryland, 1891–1897, U.S. Congressman, 1885–1891
Charles Gibson (British politician) (1889–1977), British Labour Party politician
Sir Charles Granville Gibson (1880–1948), British Conservative Party politician
Charlie Gibson (1900s catcher) (1879–1954), Major League Baseball catcher for the Philadelphia Athletics, 1905
Charlie Gibson (1920s catcher) (1899–1990), Major League Baseball catcher  for the Philadelphia Athletics, 1924
Charles Dana Gibson (1867–1944), American graphic artist
Charles Gibson (historian) (1920–1985), American ethnohistorian
Charles Gibson (special effects artist), visual effects artist Pirates of the Caribbean films
Charlie Gibson (footballer) (born 1961), Scottish footballer 
Charles Robert Gibson, Scottish author of scientific texts for children
Charles E. Gibson Jr. (1925–2017),  Vermont Attorney General
Charles Hammond Gibson Jr (1874–1954), American author

See also
Gibson (surname)